{{infobox television
| image                = Eddsworld Series Logo.png
| caption              = Official title design
| creator              = Edd Gould
| writer               = 
| director             = 
| voices               = 
| composer             = 
| country              = United Kingdom
| language             = English
| executive_producer   = 
| producer             = 
| company              = Legacy series:| network              = 
| first_aired          = 
| last_aired           = present
| genre                = 
}}Eddsworld (capitalized as EDDSWORLD in the official title design) is a British Flash-animated web series created by Edd Gould. Since premiering on 6 June 2003, the series has been published through Newgrounds, DeviantArt, YouTube, Albino Blacksheep, Tumblr, The BBC, and their website. 

Following Gould's death on 25 March 2012, Thomas Ridgewell (the former voice actor of Tom) became the series' new showrunner, launching a crowdfunding campaign to continue the show titled Eddsworld: Legacy. Preceding the release of Eddsworld: Legacy's final episode, Ridgewell announced he was leaving the show and handing control of the series to Matt Hargreaves (voice actor of Matt) and Gould's family. 

On 1 January 2017, the show's website went back online with new Eddsworld comics written and illustrated by Matt Hargreaves. On 1 August 2020, a new short was released to kick off a new era of the show called Eddsworld Beyond, with Hargreaves as showrunner.  , the Eddsworld YouTube channel has more than 4 million subscribers.

At the time of Gould's death, his YouTube channel had the most subscribers in the comedian category for the United Kingdom and was the 4th most viewed comedian in the United Kingdom. Eddsworld was noticed by the organisers of the 2009 United Nations Climate Change Conference who commissioned an episode about climate change, used in the opening ceremony of the conference.

Synopsis
Eddsworld follows the misadventures of a group of young adult "morons" living together in a house somewhere in the United Kingdom: Edd, an artist obsessed with Coca-Cola; Tom, a jaded nihilist who lacks eyeballs; Matt, a dim-witted narcissist; and (prior to his departure) Tord, a trigger-happy Norwegian addicted to hentai. The series is generally episodic, and typically has little continuity between episodes.

Cast and characters

Overview

Main characters 
The protagonists of Eddsworld are exaggerated parodies of series creator Edd Gould and his friends.

 Edd (voiced by Edd Gould [2004–2012], Tim Hautekiet [2012–2016], George Gould [2020–present]) – An adventurous artist with a green hoodie who tells puns and likes Coca-Cola and bacon.
 Tom (voiced by Thomas Ridgewell [2005–2016], Ed Templer [2021–present]) – A cynical alcoholic bass guitarist with a blue hoodie and empty eye sockets, frequently dragged along on Edd's adventures despite his protests.
 Matt (voiced by Matt Hargreaves) – A self-obsessed, dim-witted narcissist with a purple hoodie, green overcoat, and chiseled chin.
 Tord (voiced by Tord Larsson [2005–2008], Jamie Spicer-Lewis [2016]) – A trigger-happy, hentai-addicted Norwegian inventor with a red hoodie often seen smoking. He has a rivalry with Tom and dislikes "Sunshine, Lollipops and Rainbows". Tord moves away in "25ft Under the Seat" to pursue his own interests, and returns with malicious intent in "The End (Part 1 and 2)".

Supporting characters 
 Eduardo (voiced by Chris O'Neill [2010–2011], Brock Baker [2014–present]) – Edd's next-door neighbour and rival. He is obsessed with one-upping him and enjoys rubbing his misfortunes in his face.
 Jon (voiced by Eddie Bowley [2010–2016]) – Eduardo's housemate and counterpart to Tom. He is extremely unintelligent, and is physically abused by Eduardo for petty reasons. He is killed in The End (Part 2) as an indirect casualty during the battle between Edd's friends and Tord.
 Mark (voiced by Ben Rudman) – Eduardo's housemate and counterpart to Matt. Like his friends, he takes pleasure in constantly rubbing his neighbors' failures in their faces. After Jon's death, Mark comforts Eduardo during the latter's depression.
 The Evil Director (voiced by Christopher Bingham) – A villainous film director who attempted to clone Edd and his friends to bolster the sales of his film in the "Spares". He is accompanied by his assistant Larry, who hardly tolerates his idiocy.
 Paul (voiced by Paul ter Voorde [2008–2013]) – A Dutch military guard who takes on multiple roles throughout the series.
 Zanta Claws (voiced by Josh Tomar) – A zombie Santa Claus intent on destroying Christmas. He attacks and murders anyone who he sees as naughty, his frequent targets being Edd and company, and has a grudge with his successor.
 Ell (voiced by Vicky Gould) – The gender-swapped version of Edd.
 Tamara (voiced by Chloe Dungate [2015], Rachel Kiki [2020–present]) – The gender-swapped version of Tom.
 Matilda (voiced by Alice Ann Stacey [2015], Jennifer Bingham [2020–present]) – The gender-swapped version of Matt.

Notes

References

External links

2000s YouTube series
2004 web series debuts
2010s YouTube series
2020s YouTube series
British adult animated comedy television series
British animated web series
British comedy web series
Flash cartoons
Internet memes introduced in 2003
Internet memes
Film and television memes